Archie Campbell (November 7, 1914 – August 29, 1987) was an American comedian, writer, and star of Hee Haw, a country-flavored network television variety show. He was also a recording artist with several hits for RCA Victor in the 1960s.

Biography

Early career
Born in Bulls Gap, Tennessee, Campbell studied art at Mars Hill College in Mars Hill, North Carolina, after which he began a radio career at WNOX in Knoxville. After a year alongside Roy Acuff on their Mid-Day Merry-Go-Round, he relocated to WDOD in Chattanooga, where he stayed until joining the United States Navy in 1941. At the end of World War II, Campbell returned to WNOX. He left that station for rival WROL where he helped start Knoxville's first country music television show (on WROL-TV), Country Playhouse, that premiered in 1952 and ran until 1958.

At the close of that show, he moved to Nashville to replace Rod Brasfield on the nationally syndicated Prince Albert segment of the Grand Ole Opry. Shortly after, he signed a contract with RCA Victor and one of his early singles, "Trouble in the Amen Corner" reached the 1960 country music Top 25. After an unsuccessful stint with the Starday label, Campbell returned to RCA Victor in 1966 and had three Top 30 singles: "The Men in My Little Girl's Life" (1966), "The Dark End of the Street" (1968), and "Tell It Like It Is" (1968). He was named "Comedian of the Year" in 1969 by the Country Music Association.

Routines
One of Campbell's 'signature' routines was to tell stories in "Spoonerism" form, with the first letters of words in some phrases intentionally switched for comic effect. The best-known of these stories was "RinderCella", his re-telling of the fairy tale "Cinderella", about the girl who "slopped her dripper" (dropped her slipper). Campbell once told the "RinderCella" story on an episode of the game show Juvenile Jury. At the conclusion of the story, host Jack Barry said "That's one of the funniest stories Carchie Ampbell tells."  All of Campbell's spoonerism routines borrowed heavily from comedy routines performed by Colonel Stoopnagle on the radio show Stoopnagle and Budd in the 1930s. ("Colonel Stoopnagle" was the stage name of F. Chase Taylor, 1897–1950.)

Campbell also performed a routine with various partners generally known as "That's Bad/That's Good."  Campbell would state a troublesome occurrence; when the partner would sympathize by saying, "Oh that's bad," Campbell would quickly counter, "No, that's good!", and then state a good result from the previous occurrence. When the partner would say, "Oh that's good!", Campbell would immediately counter with "No, that's bad!" and tell the new result, and so on.

Hee Haw
Campbell was a charter member of the cast of Hee Haw on CBS-TV from its beginning in 1969, though he also served as a head writer.  His regular characterizations included:
"Archie's Barber Shop", in which he performed his Spoonerism stories and his "That's Bad/That's Good" routine
"Doc Campbell", with Gunilla Hutton as "Nurse Goodbody"; though Campbell portrayed a M.D., a certification hanging on the wall clearly showed him being a veterinarian (D.V.M.).
"Justus O'Peace", his version of the classic "Judge" routine of Pigmeat Markham.

One of his most well-known segments was the song "PFFT! You Was Gone", in which he would perform a short verse of original comedy, followed by the standard chorus of "Where Oh Where Are You Tonight", which would conclude with him and a singing partner, often Gordie Tapp, blowing a raspberry at one another or at the camera.  In later years, Tapp would be replaced by the episode's guest star, who was mentioned in Campbell's lyrics right before they revealed themselves.

Campbell also recorded several comedy-music albums, which he continued doing during his Hee Haw years; such as Bull Session at Bull's Creek with Junior Samples, released the year before Hee Haw premiered. He frequently performed musical duets with singer Lorene Mann.

Later life and death
In 1984, Campbell hosted TNN's Yesteryear interview show. Campbell was an accomplished amateur golfer and built one of the earliest lighted golf courses in the United States. An avid painter, he also owned an art gallery and served on the school board in Knoxville, where he lived until he suffered a fatal heart attack in 1987. He is buried near the town of Powell, Tennessee.

Legacy
Campbell's childhood home on Main Street in Bull's Gap, Tennessee has been preserved as a memorial, and has been expanded into a "tourism complex and museum" which hosts annual "Archie Campbell Days" each September.

Following Campbell's death, U.S. Highway 11E through Bulls Gap was renamed "Archie Campbell Highway" in his memory.

Discography

Albums

Singles

Guest singles

Notes

References

External links 
CMT.com profile
HeeHaw.com profile

Jones, Loyal (1998). "Archie Campbell". In The Encyclopedia of Country Music. Paul Kingsbury, Editor. New York: Oxford University Press. pp. 75–6.
Archie Campbell

1914 births
1987 deaths
People from Hawkins County, Tennessee
American male comedians
American country singer-songwriters
Mars Hill University alumni
American male television actors
People from Knoxville, Tennessee
Grand Ole Opry members
Starday Records artists
RCA Victor artists
20th-century American male actors
20th-century American singers
Singer-songwriters from Tennessee
Comedians from Tennessee
20th-century American comedians
Country musicians from Tennessee